Òscar Vendrell Corrons (Barcelona, 29 October 1973) is a proof-reader and author of textbooks and fiction works. He has signed some works under the pseudonym of Peter Walker.

Published work

Narrative 
 El Club de la petanca, (Barcelona : Publicacions de l'Abadia de Montserrat), 2010 
 Em dic Nicòstrat, (Barcelona : Publicacions de l'Abadia de Montserrat), 2010 
 La Llar dels Cabells, (Barcelona : Publicacions de l'Abadia de Montserrat), 2010 
 El Tresor de la memòria, (Barcelona : Baula), 2011 
 La Zombi espina , (Barcelona : Saldonar), 2012. 

Under the pseudonym of Peter Walker:
 Atrapat al Zombi Park, (Barcelona : Baula), 2012. 
 El Secret de Morisville, (Barcelona : Baula), 2012. 
 La nit dels zombies mutants, (Barcelona : Baula), 2012. 
 El Cau del faraó, (Barcelona : Baula), 2013. 
 La illa dels canibals, (Barcelona : Baula), 2013. 
 La fortalesa del capità Nemo, (Barcelona : Baula), 2013.

Translations 
 Jane Ray, El primer nadal. Barcelona : Montena, 2000.
 Jane Ray, Així va començar el món. Barcelona : Montena, 2000.
 Silvia Ludmer-Cohen, La Reina de la nit . Barcelona : Montena Mondadori, 2000.
 Melvin Burgess, Enamorarse en abril. Barcelona : Montena Mondadori, 2001.
 Charles Perrault, La Rateta grisa. Barcelona : Montena, 2001.
 Myriam Deru, La Rateta grisa. Barcelona : Montena, 2002.
 Richard Powell, Què rossega el ratolí?. Barcelona : Beascoa, 2002.
 Richard Powell, On juga al porquet?. Barcelona : Beascoa, 2002.
 Richard Powell, Què li agrada a l'abella?. Barcelona : Beascoa, 2002.
 Richard Powell, Què menja el conill?. Barcelona : Beascoa, 2002.
 Thierry Lenain, Els Petons de la Marta. Barcelona : Baula, 2010.
 Pierre Bottero, El Llindar obscur de la màgia. Barcelona : Baula, 2012.
 Erik L'Homme, La Pàl·lida llum de les tenebres. Barcelona : Baula, 2013.

References 

Writers from Barcelona
Catalan-language writers
21st-century Spanish writers
English–Catalan translators
1973 births
Living people
21st-century translators